Zhangguying Town is a town of Yueyang County, Hunan Province, China. It was reformed on November 30, 2015. Zhangguying Town is divided into 13 villages and a community under its jurisdiction, the seat of town is Weidong Community. The town is named after the Major National Historical and Cultural Site of Zhangguying Village.

References

Divisions of Yueyang County